Keith Henderson Forsythe (4 August 1927 – 18 July 2003) was a New Zealand field athlete who represented his country in the long jump and triple jump at the 1950 British Empire Games.

Biography
Born in Waimate on 4 August 1927, Forsythe was the son of Francis Forsythe and Jessie Dodds Forsythe (née Currie).

Representing Hawke's Bay/Poverty Bay, Forsythe won two New Zealand national athletics titles in the triple jump, in 1946 and 1948.

At the 1950 British Empire Games in Auckland, Forsythe represented New Zealand in both the long jump and triple jump.

Forsythe died on 18 July 2003.

References

1927 births
2003 deaths
People from Waimate
Athletes (track and field) at the 1950 British Empire Games
Commonwealth Games competitors for New Zealand
New Zealand male long jumpers
New Zealand male triple jumpers
Sportspeople from Canterbury, New Zealand